Garfield Jones (born 4 March 1966) is a Jamaican table tennis player. He competed in the men's singles events at the 1988 Summer Olympics.

References

External links
 

1966 births
Living people
Jamaican male table tennis players
Olympic table tennis players of Jamaica
Table tennis players at the 1988 Summer Olympics
Place of birth missing (living people)